Wind Chill is a 2007 supernatural horror film directed by Gregory Jacobs and starring Emily Blunt and Ashton Holmes. The film was produced by the British Blueprint Pictures company, and George Clooney and Steven Soderbergh's joint company Section Eight Productions supported the project financially.  The film opened in limited distribution in April 2007 in the US, was released in the United Kingdom and Ireland in August 2007, but went directly to DVD in most other markets.

Plot

A student ("Girl") at a Pennsylvania university uses the campus rideshare board to find a ride home to Wilmington, Delaware for Christmas. She joins another student ("Guy"), who is driving home to Wilmington. Unusually, he seems to know quite a lot about her. He claims they have a class together, although she never noticed him.

They stop at an isolated gas station so Girl can use the bathroom. The Girl says she needs to wait to let her nails dry, but Guy strangely offers her a piggyback ride into the store. She refuses, but he picks her up anyway and carries her into the store.

In the restroom, the door becomes stuck, and while she pounds on the door, she hears Guy and the clerk talking about her, but they do not let her out. After she manages to escape the bathroom, she angrily asks them why they didn't let her out. The two boys seem puzzled. Before they leave, Girl hears Guy asking the clerk for directions, although he claimed to have driven the route many times.

Guy then leaves the highway saying the route, marked with accident crosses, is a scenic shortcut. The Girl expresses concern but consents. Girl learns that Guy has lied about living in Delaware during the conversation. Girl demands to know exactly what is going on when suddenly Guy has to swerve to avoid a car racing straight toward them. His car ends up buried in a snowdrift. Guy observes that the oncoming car left no tire tracks. While Guy walks back to the gas station, Girl sees a dark bloated figure stagger past the car. She calls out, but it only pleads not to be thrown in the river, and then a fish emerges from the specter's mouth. Guy returns, saying the gas station is closed, but she observes that he had only been gone a very short time.

Huddling in the car, Guy admits he had been interested in her, and when he saw that she was going to check a student ride board to get home to Delaware, he saw a chance to get her alone for six uninterrupted hours to begin a relationship. The Guy said he intended to confess later and hoped they would positively look back at his gesture.

They think help has arrived when a Pennsylvania Highway Patrol cop knocks on their window. He ignores their predicament, believing they were "parking". The Girl believes he is a corrupt cop looking for a bribe. He violently drags the Girl to the back of his old-fashioned patrol car, but the Guy hits the cop with a tire iron. They both jerk awake, finding that the Guy has the tire iron frozen in his frostbitten hands. She realizes the Guy was injured in the car crash but had been hiding it.

The cop keeps reappearing, always heralded by Brenda Lee's "Rockin' Around the Christmas Tree" on the car's radio. The Girl dreams of the many people the cop has killed until the priests discover him.

The Girl has the idea to use an old telephone in the car to call for help from the junction box on a nearby telephone pole. She tells the Guy to honk the horn when the song appears on the radio. She climbs the telephone pole, connects the telephone, and reaches 911 but is unsure if they can hear her. Returning to the car, she finds that the Guy has died.

Girl sees headlights approaching, thinking that it is the cop, but it turns out to be a snow-plow driver responding to her call. The snow-plow driver puts Guy's body on the back of the truck, and they leave. While driving, he tells her that in the early 1950s, a corrupt cop murdered people on this stretch of road, and their bodies were never found. In 1953 he ran a young couple off the road, but lost control and also died in the ravine. Frequently, around this time of year, more people die on this road. In 1961, the priests were found frozen to death in their beds.

The plowman sees headlights and believes more help has arrived. Instead, the ghostly cop runs them off the road. Despite Girl's pleas, the driver gets out to help the person in the other car. Girl follows him, and the pair see the two burning cars from 1953 down the ravine. They see the priests walk down to the trapped cop, but instead of helping him, they pull the microphone from his police radio, leaving him to burn alive. His burned body crawls out and tears up the plowman, who freezes solid.

She runs back to the truck and tries to start it, but the ghostly cop reappears. The ghost of Guy appears and hits the cop with a tire iron.

She jerks awake and realizes she's back in the car, with Guy's body next to her. She screams in despair, but Guy's ghost appears and leads her through the ruined priests' home, to the gas station where he disappears. He says again that this will be a sweet, funny story.

Coroners load Guy's body into a van as Girl is wrapped in a blanket by a paramedic.

Cast
Note: No character in the film is ever named.

 Emily Blunt as Girl
 Ashton Holmes as Guy
 Martin Donovan as Highway Patrolman
 Ned Bellamy as Snowplow Driver
 Chelan Simmons as Blonde Girl

Filming locations

The college scenes in the film were shot at the University of British Columbia near Vancouver, British Columbia, Canada. Outdoor scenes of the movie were shot near Peachland, British Columbia, in February and March 2006.

Release

Home media
The film was released on DVD by Sony Pictures Home Entertainment on September 4, 2007 in a 2-disc set. In the UK it was available with special holographic sleeve.

The film debuted on Blu-ray for the first time in the US on April 4, 2017 by Mill Creek Entertainment. It is included as part of a 3-pack alongside Perfect Stranger (2007) and Straightheads (2007).

Reception
Rotten Tomatoes gave Wind Chill an approval rating of 46% based on reviews from 24 critics. The site's consensus states: "Wind Chill is a ghost story with a clunky and unpolished script that fails to keep viewers in suspense." Metacritic rates it at 52% based on reviews from 7 critics, indicating "mixed or average reviews".

Justing Change of Variety called it an "intermittently effective thriller" and "a rickety vehicle for its two perfectly cast leads". Andy Webster of The New York Times called it "A moody, spooky tale, rendered with laudable economy."
TV Guide gave the film two stars out of five. BBC also gave two stars out of five.

See also

 Holiday horror
 List of films set around Christmas

References

External links
 
 

2007 films
2000s ghost films
2007 horror films
2000s Christmas horror films
American supernatural horror films
British Christmas horror films
2000s English-language films
British supernatural horror films
Films set in Pennsylvania
Films shot in Vancouver
Films scored by Clint Mansell
Films directed by Gregory Jacobs
Films produced by Graham Broadbent
Films set in 1953
TriStar Pictures films
American Christmas horror films
2000s American films
2000s British films